Dorel is a Romanian male given name and surname that may refer to:

Given name 
 Dorel Balint (born 1969), Romanian football defender
 Dorel Bernard (born 1974), Romanian football defender
 Dorel Cristudor (born 1954), Romanian sprinter and bobsledder
 Dorel Golan, Israeli pianist
  (born 1946), actor
 Dorel Moiș (born 1975), Romanian aerobic gymnast
 Dorel Mutică (born 1973), Romanian footballer and manager
 Dorel Simion (born 1977), Romanian boxer
 Dorel Stoica (born 1978), Romanian footballer
 Dorel Vișan (born 1937), Romanian actor
 Dorel Zaharia (born 1978), Romanian football striker
 Dorel Zegrean (born 1969), Romanian football defender
 Dorel Zugrăvescu (1930–2019), Romanian geophysicist

Surname 
 Vincent Dorel (born 1992), French football goalkeeper

Romanian masculine given names